Lilith's Brood is a collection of three works by Octavia E. Butler.  The three volumes of this science fiction series (Dawn, Adulthood Rites, and Imago) were previously collected in the now out-of-print volume Xenogenesis. The collection was first published under the current title of Lilith's Brood in 2000.

Synopsis

Dawn (1987) 
The first novel in the trilogy, Dawn, begins with Lilith Iyapo, a black human woman, alone in what seems like a prison cell.  She has memories of this happening before, with an enigmatic voice that asks strange questions.  She has no idea who this is or what they want.  She remembers a nuclear war and an earlier traffic accident in which her husband and child had been killed.

The truth emerges by stages.  The same questions are asked.  She is then visited by humanoid beings whose appearance terrifies her, even though they behave well.  She learns that the nuclear war had left the Earth uninhabitable. Humans are all but extinct. The few survivors were plucked from the dying Earth by an alien race, the Oankali. Lilith has awakened 250 years after the war on a living Oankali ship. 

At first, she is repulsed by the alienness of her saviors/captors. The Oankali have sensory tentacles all over their bodies, including locations of human sensory organs, with which they perceive the world differently than humans. Stranger still, the Oankali have three sexes: male, female, and Ooloi. Oankali have the ability to perceive genetic biochemistry, but the Ooloi manipulate genetic material to mutate other beings and build offspring from their mates' genetic material. 

Lilith eventually bonds to Nikanj, an Ooloi. The Oankali have made Earth habitable and obtain Lilith's help in awakening and training humans to survive on the changed Earth. In exchange, the Oankali want to interbreed with the humans to blend the human and Oankali races, a biological imperative they compare to a human's need to breathe. They perceive the interbreeding as mutually beneficial; in particular, it will solve what the Oankali think is the humans' fatal combination of intelligence and hierarchical tendencies. They are particularly attracted to humans' "talent" for cancer, which they will use to reshape themselves. The humans rebel against Lilith and the proposed "gene trade," and kill Joseph, Lilith's new mate. This group is sent to Earth without her. Nikanj uses Joseph's collected DNA to impregnate Lilith with the first Oankali/human child.

Adulthood Rites (1988) 
The second book, Adulthood Rites, takes place years after the end of Dawn. Humans and Oankali live together on Earth, but not in complete peace. Some humans have accepted the bargain and live with the Oankali, giving birth to hybrid children called "constructs." Others, however, have refused the bargain and live in separate, all-human, "resister" villages. The Ooloi have made all humans infertile, so the only children born are those made with Ooloi intervention. This creates a great deal of tension and strain as the humans consider their lives meaningless without reproduction, especially as they see themselves being outbred by the Oankali-human constructs. Desperate humans often steal human-looking construct children to raise as their own. 

The main character of this book, Akin, is the first male construct born to a human mother (Lilith). Akin has more human in him than any construct before him. Adulthood Rites focuses on Akin's struggle with his human and Oankali heritage. As a human, he understands the desire to fight for the survival of humanity as an independent race. As an Oankali he understands that the combination of the species is necessary and that humans would destroy themselves again if left alone. Akin is kidnapped by the resisters as an infant, when the only evidence of his construct status is a tentacle-like tongue through which he samples his world in the Oankali manner of identifying DNA. The Oankali allow the resisters to keep him for a sustained period of time so that he might understand his human nature more fully, but at the cost of the connection to his paired sibling that would have happened had he stayed with his family. His isolation is hugely painful to them both, and he is taken to the orbiting ship to experience whatever healing he and his insufficiently-paired sibling can be granted. During that time, he travels around the ship with an Akjai, an Oankali who has no human DNA. 

Through these experiences, he realizes that humans, too, need an Akjai group, and his conviction ultimately persuades the Oankali. Humans will be given Mars, modified sufficiently to (barely) support human existence, despite the Oankali certainty that the Mars colony will destroy itself eventually. Akin returns to tell the resisters and begin gathering them up to have their fertility restored before transport to their new world.

Imago (1989) 
The final book of the trilogy, Imago, is the shortest. Imago shows the reader what has been hinted at for the last two books: the full potential of the new human-Oankali hybrid species. The story is in the first person from the perspective of Jodahs, the first Ooloi construct, and a child of Lilith. Through its unique heritage, it has unlocked latent genetic potential of humans and Oankali. 

It is mentioned in passing that the human colony on Mars is doing OK.

Imago brings a sense of completeness to the three books, by allowing the reader to understand the Oankali better by understanding Jodahs. Jodahs also builds upon Lilith and Akin's human-Oankali integration work from the previous two novels; the novel ends with the humans more willingly acquiescing to the Oankali.

Background 
In her 2000 interview with Charles Brown, Butler identified the Cold War under the Reagan Administration as a main motivator for the trilogy: “I was pretty despairing when I began the Xenogenesis books. This was back during the first Reagan administration, when the guy was talking about ‘winnable’ nuclear wars, ‘limited’ nuclear wars and all that. It scared me that we were electing someone who was talking that way. What if he meant it?”

Butler later expanded her explanation in an interview with Joshunda Sanders: 

I thought there must be something basic, something really genetically wrong with us if we're falling for this stuff [Reagan’s rhetoric]. And I came up with these characteristics. The aliens arrive after the war and they tell us that we have these two characteristics that don't work and play well together. They are intelligent, and they tell us we're the most intelligent species they've come across. But we're also hierarchical. And I put this after the big war because it's kind of an example. We've one-upped ourselves to death, just our tendency to one-up each other as individuals and groups, large and small.

Themes

Throughout the Xenogenesis trilogy themes of sexuality, gender, race, and species are explored. The Oankali believe that the human species have an inevitably self-destructive "Contradiction" between their high intelligence and their hierarchical natures. According to the Oankali, this is what caused the war that almost ended the human race, and this is why they cannot leave humans alone. Lilith and the Oankali-human hybrids are constantly battling with this inner conflict. According to Tor.com's Erika Nelson, the trilogy parallels the story of African slaves in America and the conflict that later generations of African Americans feel regarding their integration into American society. The human-Oankali hybrids feel that they have somehow betrayed their human side by integrating into Oankali society, but at the same time, because of the vast power imbalance, they never really had another viable option. In addition to allegorizing slavery, the trilogy more generally is written "in the context of colonization," as Nelson puts it, raising broad questions of coercion and agency. The relationship between the Oankali and the humans speaks to a range of imperialist relationships, from slavery to internment camps to eugenics. The series also draws upon elements of the myth of Lilith, the first wife of Adam.

The series also heavily draws on themes of consent and coercion.

In addition to the social themes, the possible results of developing genetic science and biologically based technology are shown by the Oankali's genetic mastery. Joan Slonczewski, a biologist, published a review of the series in which she discusses the biological implications of the ooloi and how they can, through genetic engineering, achieve positive effects from "bad" genes such as a predisposition for cancer. Biological determinism is another ongoing thematic concern in the trilogy that links Butler's use of social and scientific themes; because the Oankali believe above all in a species' innate biological tendencies, characters must constantly negotiate between their supposed biological capacities and the limits of their individual will.

Reception
Orson Scott Card commends the Xenogenesis trilogy as "more satisfying as hard science fiction" than Butler's earlier Patternist novels, specifically in that they show "how much power her storytelling has gained" in the intervening years. In terms of each novel, Adele Newson praises the prose of Dawn, as "engaging" and having "a single-minded intensity." She highlights the relationship among the novel's main characters, Lilith and Joseph, as being unusual for science fiction to the point of being "refreshing" and "sensuous." Calling Lilith "the epitome of heroic womanism," Newson argues that "Lilith's life, like that of the black woman's, is a metaphor for the quest which would resolve the problem of her being both revered and despised by those with whom she inhabits society. In contrast, Newson finds the story's development in Adulthood Rites "disappointing": Lilith, she points out, "does little more than sulk silently away"  and the story relies so much on "laborious" dialogue that it becomes "more or less a treatise in on the contradictory and often violent nature of humankind." Similarly, Ted White from The Washington Post finds Imago verbose and "wandering" and concludes that, as an end to the trilogy, it is "anticlimactic."

Each of the three novels originally was nominated for the Locus Award for Best Science Fiction Novel in the year it was published (1987, 1988, and 1989), though none of the books won the award.

Adaptations
In September 2015, it was announced that producer Allen Bain had optioned the rights to make Dawn for television. On February 26, 2020, Amazon Studios acquired the streaming rights with Victoria Mahoney writing and directing the pilot episode based on Dawn, and will produce the series with Bain, Pearl, and Carter's Brainframe, Ava DuVernay's Array Filmworks and Charles D. King's MACRO.

Further reading

Scholarship 
 Mehta (2019) "Indigenous maternal and child health" Dawn  by Octavia Butler used in course syllabus, University of Manitoba. Department of community  health sciences. Family 4606.
 Ackerman, Erin M. Pryor. "Becoming and Belonging: The Productivity of Pleasures and Desires in Octavia Butler's "Xenogenesis" Trilogy." Extrapolation 49.1, Spring 2008.
 Belk, Nolan. "The Certainty of the Flesh: Octavia Butler's Use of the Erotic in the Xenogenesis Trilogy." Utopian Studies 19.3 Sept. 2008.
 Bonner, Frances. "Difference and Desire, Slavery and Seduction: Octavia Butler's Xenogenesis." Contemporary Literary Criticism, edited by Jeffrey W. Hunter, vol. 230. Gale, 2007. Originally published in Foundation 48 (Spring 1990): 50–62.
 Braid, Christina. "Contemplating and Contesting Violence in Dystopia: Violence in Octavia Butler's Xenogenesis Trilogy." Contemporary Justice Review 9.1 (Mar. 2000): 47–65. 
 Boulter, Amanda. "Polymorphous Futures: Octavia E. Butler's Xenogenesis Trilogy." American Bodies: Cultural Histories of the Physique. Ed. Tim Armstrong. New York: NYU P, 1996. 170–185.
 Brataas, Delilah Bermudez. "Becoming Utopia in Octavia E. Butler's Xenogenesis Series." Foundation: The International Review of Science Fiction 35 (96) (Spring 2006): 84-101.
 Curtis, Claire P. "Utopian Possibilities: Disability, Norms, and Eugenics in Octavia Butler's Xenogenesis. " Journal of Literary & Cultural Disability Studies 9.1 Jan. 2015, pp. 19–33.
 Federmayer, Eva. "Octavia Butler's Maternal Cyborgs: The Black Female World of the Xenogenesis Trilogy." Hungarian Journal of English and American Studies 6.1 (Spring 2000): 103–118. 
 Freccero, Carla. "Octavia Butler's Xenogenesis." Popular Culture: An Introduction. New York: New York UP, 1999. 72–75.
 Green, Michelle Erica. "'There Goes the Neighborhood': Octavia Butler's Demand for Diversity in Utopias." Contemporary Literary Criticism, edited by Jeffrey W. Hunter and Polly Vedder, vol. 121. Gale, 2000. Originally published in Utopian and Science Fiction by Women: Worlds of Difference, edited by Jane L. Donawerth and Carol A. Kolmerten, Syracuse University Press, 1994, pp. 166–189.
 Goss, Theodora. "The Gothic Technological Imaginary in Mary Shelley's Frankenstein and Octavia Butler's Xenogenesis." Modern Fiction Studies 53.3 (Fall 2007): 434–459. 
 Grewe-Volpp, Christa. "Octavia Butler and the Nature/Culture Divide: An Ecofeminist Approach to the Xenogenesis Trilogy." Restoring the Connection to the Natural World: Essays on the African American Environmental Imagination. Ed. Sylvia Mayer. Munster, Germany: LIT, 2003. 149–173.
 Holden, Rebecca J. "The High Costs of Cyborg Survival: Octavia Butler's Xenogenesis Trilogy." In Foundation: The International Review of Science Fiction, No.72 (Spring 1998): 49–57.
 Jacobs, Naomi. "Posthuman Bodies and Agency in Octavia Butler's Xenogenesis." Dark Horizons: Science Fiction and the Dystopian Imagination. Ed. Tom Moylan and Raffaella Baccolini. New York: Routledge, 2003.91-112. 
 Jesser, Nancy. "Blood, Genes and Gender in Octavia Butler's Kindred and Dawn." Contemporary Literary Criticism Select. Gale, 2008. Originally published in Extrapolation 43. 1, Spring 2002, pp. 36–61.
 Jesser, Nancy. "Blood, Genes and Gender in Octavia Butler's Kindred and Dawn." Extrapolation: A Journal of Science Fiction and Fantasy 43.1 (2002): 36–61.
 Johns, Adam. "Octavia Butler and the Art of Pseudoscience." English Language Notes 47. 2 Fall/Winter 2009.
 Johns, J. Adam. "Becoming Medusa: Octavia Butler's 'Lilith's Brood' and Sociobiology." Science Fiction Studies, vol. 37, no. 3, 2010, pp. 382–400.
 Magedanz, Stacy. "The Captivity Narrative in Octavia E. Butler's Adulthood Rites." Extrapolation 53. 1 2012 p. 45+. 
 Miller, Jim. "Post-Apocalyptic Hoping: Octavia Butler's Dystopian/Utopian Vision." Science Fiction Studies, vol. 25, no. 2, 1998, pp. 336–360. 
 Nanda, Aparajita. "Re-Writing the Bhabhian "Mimic Man": Akin, the Posthuman Other in Octavia Butler's Adulthood Rites." Ariel, 41. 3/4, Jul-Oct 2011, pp. 115-135.
 Nanda, Aparajita. "Power, Politics, and Domestic Desire in Octavia Butler's Lilith's Brood." Callaloo 36. 3 2013 pp. 773–788.
 Obourn, Megan. "Octavia Butler's Disabled Futures." Contemporary Literature. 54. 1 Spring 2013.
 Osherow, Michele. "The Dawn of a New Lilith: Revisionary Mythmaking in Women's Science Fiction." NWSA Journal 12.1 (Spring 2000): 68–83. 
 Outterson, Sarah. "Diversity, Change, Violence: Octavia Butler's Pedagogical Philosophy." Utopian Studies 19. 3 2008, pp. 433–456. 
 Peppers, Cathy. "Origins and Alien Identities in Butler's Xenogenesis."  Science Fiction Studies 22.1 (1995): 47–62. 
 Peppers, Cathy. "Dialogic Origins and Alien Identities in Butler's XENOGENESIS."  Science Fiction Studies. No. 65,  Vol. 22, 1995.
 Plisner, Andrew. "Arboreal Dialogics: An Ecocritical Exploration of Octavia Butler's Dawn." African Identities 7. 2, May 2009.
 Sands, Peter. "Octavia Butler's Chiastic Cannibalistics." Utopian Studies 14.1, 2003, pp. 1–14. 
 Schwab, Gabriele. "Ethnographies of the Future: Personhood, Agency, and Power in Octavia Butler's Xenogenesis." Accelerating Possession: Global Futures of Property and Personhood. Ed. Bill Maurer and Gabriele Schwab. New York: Columbia UP, 2006. 204–228. 
 Seed, David. "Posthuman Bodies and Agency in Octavia Butler' s Xenogenesis." Dark Horizons: Science Fiction and the Dystopian Imagination. Ed. Raffaella Baccolini and Tom Moylan. New York: Routledge, 2003. 91-111.  
 Smith, Stephanie A. "Morphing, Materialism, and the Marketing of Xenogenesis." Genders 18 (Winter 1993): 67–86.
 Smith, Rachel Greenwald. "Ecology beyond Ecology: Life After the Accident in Octavia Butler's Xenogenesis Trilogy." Modern Fiction Studies 55. 3, Fall 2009, pp. 545–565. 
 Slonczewski, Joan. "Octavia Butler's Xenogenesis Trilogy: A Biologist's Response." Presented at SFRA, Cleveland, June 30, 2000.
 Stickgold-Sarah, Jessie. "Your Children Will Know Us, You Never Will": The Pessimistic Utopia of Octavia Butler's Xenogenesis Trilogy." Extrapolation 51. 3, Fall 2010.  
 Talbot, Mary M. "'Embracing Otherness': An Examination of Octavia Butler's Xenogenesis Trilogy." Kimota 5 (Winter 1996): 45-49.
 Tucker, Jeffrey A. "'The Human Contradiction: Identity and/as Essence in Octavia Butler's Xenogenesis Trilogy." Yearbook of English Studies 37.2(2007): 164-181. 
 Wallace, Molly. "Reading Octavia Butler's "Xenogenesis" After Seattle." Contemporary Literature 50.1 Spring 2009, pp. 94-128. 
 White, Eric. "The Erotics of Becoming: Xenogenesis and The Thing." Science Fiction Studies 20.3 (1993): 394-408. 
 Wood, Sarah. "Subversion through Inclusion: Octavia Butler's Interrogation of Religion in Xenogenesis and Wild Seed." FEMSPEC 6.1 (2005): 87–99.
 Yu, Jeboon. "The Representation of Inappropriate/d Others: The Epistemology of Donna Haraway s Cyborg Feminism and Octavia Butler's Xenogenesis Series." Journal of English Language and Literature 50.3 (2004): 759–777.

Reviews 
 Card, Orson Scott. "Review of Mind of My Mind, Patternmaster, and Survivor." Contemporary Literary Criticism, edited by Jeffrey W. Hunter and Polly Vedder, vol. 121, Gale, 2000. Originally published in Fantasy & Science Fiction, Jan. 1992, pp. 52–54. 
 Constance, Joseph W and Nora Rawlinson. "Adulthood Rites (Book)." Library Journal 113. 11 15 June 1988 p. 70.
 Mediatore, Kaite. "She Reads: SF/Fantasy." (Review of Dawn). Booklist 101. 16 15 Apr. 2005 p. 1443.
 Nelson, Erica. "Sleeping With the Enemy: Octavia Butler's Dawn." Tor.com 30 September 2009.  
 Nelson, Erica. "Negotiating Difference in Octavia Butler's Adulthood Rites." Tor.com 12 October 2009. 
 Nelson, Erica. "Playing Human in Octavia Butler's Imago." Tor.com26 October 2009.
 Newson, Adele S. "Review of Dawn and Adulthood Rites." Black American Literature Forum 23 Summer 1989, pp. 389–396.
 White, Ted. "Love with the Proper Stranger." (Review of Imago). The Washington Post. 25 June 1989, p. X8.
 Yescavage, Karen, David Lumb, and Jonathan Alexander. "Part Four of Imagining Alien Sex: Preparing for the Alien". Los Angeles Review of Books. January 5, 2014.

References

External links

Lilith's Brood reviews from Powell's
"Celebrating Dawn by Octavia Butler"

Biopunk novels
Science fiction book series
Science fiction novel trilogies
1980s science fiction novels
Novels by Octavia Butler
Feminist science fiction novels
American science fiction novels
Novels set during the Cold War
Novels about extraterrestrial life
Novels about genetic engineering
Sexuality in novels